The Grabovička River ( / Грабовичка ријека, "Grabovica River") is  one of left tributaries of the Vrbanja River.  It rises nearby to Miljevići village (around 1050 metres above sea level), below the road to Golo Brdo (Naked Hill), on south slopes of Ježica (1276 m) and Zastijenje (loc: Zāstinje – Backrocks; 1230 m).

Regional road Skender Vakuf – Travnik runs along the ridge of the Undervlašić's plateau. The ridge marked the border between Vrbanja's and Ugar basins. This river enters into deep canyon, with depth as much as 350 meters. Grabovička River runs through this canyon near Grabovica, old village.

The mouth of Grabovička River is in the new part of Grabovica village (Bosnia) after which this river is named. In some sources it is (incorrectly) referred to as  "Grabovačka River" ( / Грабовачка ријека). The mouth is 450 meters above sea level and its length is around 8 km.

During the War in Bosnia, in Grabovica's Elementary school, around 200 Bosniaks "disappeared" from Večići village and its surrounding settlements. Their remains remain undiscovered.

See also
Vrbanja (river)
Grabovica, Kotor Varoš
Šiprage
Kotor Varoš

References

External links 
http://www.maplandia.com/bosnia-and-herzegovina/republika-srpska/kotor-varos/
http://www.geody.com/geospot.php?world=terra&map=col&ufi=-85418&alc=ktr&start=150
https://web.archive.org/web/20141219052551/http://www.panoramio.com/map#lt=44.478702&ln=17.483626&z=4&k=2&a=1&tab=1&pl=all

Rivers of Bosnia and Herzegovina